South Hummocks is a locality in the Mid North of South Australia at the head of Gulf St Vincent adjacent to Yorke Peninsula on the southeastern slopes of the Hummock Range.

Most of South Hummocks is part of the Hundred of Kulpara in the District Council of Barunga West, but a strip along the northern and eastern sides is part of Hundred of Cameron and Hundred of Goyder in the Wakefield Regional Council. For federal elections, it is in the federal Division of Grey. It is in the state electoral district of Narungga.

South Hummocks formerly had a government school and a church. The former South Hummocks railway station on the Port Wakefield–Moonta railway line was just over the southern boundary in the locality of Port Arthur. The school opened in 1882 and closed in 1945. The post office opened in 1869, closed 1917 to 1925, then finally closed again in 1952.

References

Further reading

Towns in South Australia